Belchamp may refer to the following places in England:

Belchamp Otten
Belchamp St Paul
Belchamp Walter
Belchamp Rural District (former)